Queensborough is a neighbourhood in the city of New Westminster, British Columbia, Canada. It is on the eastern tip of Lulu Island on the Fraser River.

At the north end of Queensborough is a new development called Port Royal. To the south is Thompson's Landing, to the west is the industrial area of Tree Island, and to the east is the Fraser River.  Access to Annacis Island, an industrial park area and site of one of the GVRD's sewage plants, is via a bridge towards the east end of Queensborough, though the island itself is not part of the City of New Westminster.

History
Queensborough was the name originally chosen for the colonial capital by Royal Engineers Commander Colonel Richard Clement Moody. Queen Victoria designated New Westminster instead of Queensborough as her new capital's name.  In the 1860s, a survey of Lulu Island by the Royal Engineers resulted in the eastern tip of the island being designated a military reserve for the defense of New Westminster.  This portion of land was not incorporated into the new Township of Richmond in 1879.  Instead the rapidly growing City of New Westminster annexed the area in 1889.  The City received title to the entire Military Reserve from the Provincial Government and it decided to subdivide the area for sale in 1890.  A bridge was constructed to reach the area from the Mainland and the lands sold at auction.

The name Queensborough for this neighbourhood of the City was formally established in 1911 when the Queensborough Post Office was opened by early community leader and Italian immigrant Anthony Sprice. In the Chinook Jargon, it is said that an adaption of the name Queensborough – "Koonspa" – is the usual name for New Westminster as a whole.

With its many lumber mills and canneries the area became a focus of new immigrants looking for employment and cheap lots to establish family homes. These early groups built their own cultural halls, churches and had many different mutual aid societies.  However, the entire community united at time under the Queensborough Ratepayers Association founded in 1911.  This group continues to operate and is often cited as the oldest ratepayers association in British Columbia.  Early immigrants came from Asia and Europe; including the Japanese, Chinese, Indians, Italians, Greeks, Slovaks, Ukrainians, and Finns. The community grew slowly but developed a unique sense of place because of its unique cultural composition.

Queensborough is today a growing suburban district with a rapidly redeveloped waterfront area known as Port Royal.  Queensborough is connected to the rest of New Westminster by the Queensborough Bridge and Annacis Island in Delta by the Derwent Way Bridge. Furthermore, the city of New Westminster has also implemented a ferry service that takes city inhabitants and tourists from Port Royal in Queensborough to the Westminster Quay. It is served by Highway 91A. Many new homes in the area are built to resemble old heritage-style homes.

In the heart of Queensborough is Ryall Park. This is also where Queensborough Community Centre is located. The park has several features which include playgrounds, a spray park and Boro All Wheel Park (a skatepark and a bike park). Renovations are currently under way converting Ryall's bike park section of Boro All Wheel Park into an off-leash park for dogs. This park will be split and will have designated areas for small dogs, and all other dogs. Queensborough Middle School and Queen Elizabeth Elementary School are also located in the same park-block.

In 2004 a shopping centre called Queensborough Landing was built.

Education
One elementary school, Queen Elizabeth Elementary School, and one middle school, Queensborough Middle School, are located in the neighbourhood.

A Library and community centre were also recently opened. The community centre has a newly renovated exercise area and a gymnasium where local residents partake in physical games.

Demographics

A legacy of early 20th century settlement, the neighbourhood has a large South Asian population. In recent decades the European and East Asian population have grown with the area witnessing increasing residential development and infill. In the 1960s, there were many new European immigrants; Italians, Portuguese, Polish, Romanian and Russian. In the 1970s, Asian immigration increased; a new wave of Indian immigrants settled in the area, along with Chinese and Filipino newcomers.

References

Neighbourhoods in New Westminster
Populated places on the Fraser River